Corymbia latifolia, commonly known as the round-leaved bloodwood, round leaf bloodwood,  wubam and other names in indigenous languages, is a species of tree that is endemic to northern Australia. It has thin, rough bark over part or all of the trunk, smooth bark above, triangular or broadly egg-shaped adult leaves, flower buds in groups of seven, creamy white flowers and urn-shaped fruit.

Description
Flowering occurs between November and March and the flowers are creamy white.

Taxonomy and naming
Round-leaved bloodwood was first formally described in 1859 by Ferdinand von Mueller in Journal of the Proceedings of the Linnean Society, Botany and was given the name Eucalyptus latifolia. In 1995, Ken Hill and Lawrie Johnson changed the name to Corymbia latifolia.

Indigenous Australians of the Yangman peoples know the plant as wubam or dolyan, the Ngarinyman know it as jadburru, the Warray as warrajan and the Wagiman as jimarnin.

Distribution and habitat
Corymbia latifolia is found on rocky slopes, plateaus and hills growing in sandy soils and has a range across the north of Australia extending from the tip of Cape York Peninsula in Queensland through the Top End and off-shore islands of the Northern Territory to the Kimberley region of Western Australia. There are also scattered populations in Papua New Guinea and on some Torres Strait Islands. It is sometimes the dominant species in low-lying areas in wetter part of the Northern Territory and the Kimberley.

See also
 List of Corymbia species

References

latifolia
Myrtales of Australia
Flora of Western Australia
Flora of the Northern Territory
Flora of Queensland
Flora of Papua New Guinea
Plants described in 1859
Taxa named by Ferdinand von Mueller